François Armand Gervaise (1660–1761) was a French Discalced Carmelite and historian.

Life
Gervaise was born at Paris.  Having been nominated prior of a convent, he chanced to meet Bossuet, who recognized in him a learned writer, and an eloquent orator. He entered La Trappe in 1695, where he became the disciple of the Abbé de Rancé, and made his profession in 1696. In the same year Dom Zozime Foisil, who had succeeded the Abbé de Rancé after his resignation, died after a few months of administration, and de Rancé then asked the king, with the pressing recommendation of Bossuet, for Dom Gervaise as his second successor.

On 20 October 1696, he received the abbatial blessing. But his turbulent administration, which in several points was opposed to that of the Abbé de Rancé, soon made for him numerous enemies. Dom Gervaise resigned in 1698. Soon, however, he regretted this step and tried to withdraw his resignation, but without success. Under the abbot chosen to fill his place he left La Trappe and began a wandering life from monastery to monastery, exercising his talent as a writer.

The history of the Reform of Cîteaux caused his final disgrace. He was obliged to interrupt its publication, and was banished by order of the king to the monastery of the Reclus, in the Diocese of Troyes, where he died. Until the end of his life he remained faithful to the austerities of the life of La Trappe, observing in all its rigour the rule he had embraced.

Works

His style is always well-turned and flowing, but he is reproached for being sometimes wanting both in exactitude as to his information and in polemical moderation.

His works included:

the lives of several Fathers of the Church and ecclesiastical writers; 
the life of Abélard; 
the life of Joachim of Fiore;
the life of Abbot Suger; 
a criticism on Marsolier's "Life of the Abbé de Rancé", in which he makes his own apology.

References

1660 births
1761 deaths
French abbots
Discalced Carmelites
18th-century French historians
Clergy from Paris
French male non-fiction writers